The 1965–66 Hellenic Football League season was the 13th in the history of the Hellenic Football League, a football competition in England.

Premier Division

The Premier Division featured 16 clubs which competed in the division last season, along with two new clubs, promoted from Division One:
Thatcham
Waddesdon

League table

Division One

The Division One featured 12 clubs which competed in the division last season, along with 4 new club:
Henley Town, relegated from the Premier Division
Hungerford Town, relegated from the Premier Division
Aston Clinton 
Buckingham Athletic

League table

References

External links
 Hellenic Football League

1965-66
H